Lee Ho may refer to:

Injong of Joseon (1515–1545), Korean king of the Joseon Dynasty
Hyojong of Joseon (1619–1659), Korean king of the Joseon Dynasty
Lee Ho (volleyball) (born 1973), South Korean volleyball player
Lee Ho (footballer, born 1984), South Korean football player
Lee Ho (footballer, born 1986), South Korean football player
Lee Ho (rower) (born 1976), South Korean Olympic rower